The 1929 New Orleans streetcar strike was a labor dispute between streetcar workers and the New Orleans Public Service, Inc. (NOPSI). Involving 1,100 workers, it began on July 1, 1929, and lasted over four months. It is credited with the creation of the Po' boy sandwich.

References

History of New Orleans
1929 in Louisiana
1929 labor disputes and strikes
Economy of New Orleans
Labor disputes in Louisiana
Streetcar strikes in the United States